Gene P. Pelowski, Jr. (born February 2, 1952) is Minnesota politician and member of the Minnesota House of Representatives. A member of the Minnesota Democratic–Farmer–Labor Party (DFL), he represents District 26A, which includes Winona County in southeastern Minnesota. He was also a teacher at Winona Senior High School in Winona.

Early life and education 
Born in 1952, Pelowski attended Red Wing High School. He received a bachelor's degree in social studies and a master's in education from Winona State University. Pelowski taught and coached debate at Winona High School and was a golf professional when he was elected to the legislature.

Minnesota House of Representatives
Pelowski was first elected in 1986, and has been reelected every two years since, for a total of 19 terms. He represented the old District 34B before the 1992 legislative redistricting, and the old District 32A before the 2002 legislative redistricting. After the 2022 election, he represented the new District 26A. As of 2023, he is the longest-serving member of the Minnesota House of Representatives.

During his time in the legislature, Pelowski has served on and chaired numerous committees. In 1997-98, he chaired the Higher Education Committee. Pelowski was an assistant minority leader during the 2003-04 session. After the DFL retook the House in 2006, Pelowski chaired the Governmental Operations, Reform, Technology and Elections Committee until 2011. In 2013-14, he again chaired the Higher Education Committee. After House DFLers regained the majority in 2018, Pelowski chaired both the Subcommittee on Legislative Process Reform and the Industrial Education Jobs and Economic Development Finance Division until the end of the 2021 session. He now again chairs the Higher Education Committee. 

In 2013, Pelowski was honored at the Polish Consulate during a visit to the Polish museum in Winona.

References

External links

 Rep. Pelowski Web Page
 Gene Pelowski Campaign Web Site

1952 births
Living people
People from Winona, Minnesota
Winona State University alumni
Democratic Party members of the Minnesota House of Representatives
American politicians of Polish descent
21st-century American politicians